Croatia competed in the Summer Olympic Games for the first time as an independent nation at the 1992 Summer Olympics in Barcelona, Spain.  Previously, Croatian athletes had competed for Yugoslavia at the Olympic Games.

Medalists

Competitors
The following is the list of number of competitors in the Games.

Athletics

Men
Track & road events

Field events

Basketball

Men's Team Competition

Preliminary round
The top four places in each of the preliminary round groups advanced to the eight team, single-elimination knockout stage, where Group A teams would meet Group B teams.

Group A

Quarterfinals

Semifinals

Gold medal game

Roster

Vladan Alanović
Franjo Arapović
Danko Cvjetičanin
Alan Gregov
Arijan Komazec
Toni Kukoč
Aramis Naglić
Velimir Perasović
Dražen Petrović
Dino Rađa
Stojko Vranković
Žan Tabak

Boxing

Men

Canoeing

Slalom

Sprint
Men

Equestrian

 Hermann Weiland on "Dufy 2", show jumping
 52 points, 72nd place

Rowing

Men

Sailing

Men

Open

Shooting

Women

Open

Table tennis

Taekwondo

Taekwondo was a demonstration sport at the 1992 Summer Olympics.

Tennis

Men

Wrestling

Men's Greco-Roman

References

sports-reference
Official Olympic Reports
International Olympic Committee results database

Nations at the 1992 Summer Olympics
Olympics
1992